Hinlopen is a surname. Notable people with the surname include:

Jan Jacobszoon Hinlopen (1626–1666), Dutch cloth merchant
Jacob J. Hinlopen (1582–1629), Dutch merchant 
Thijmen Jacobsz Hinlopen (1572–1637), Dutch merchant and whaler

See also
 Hinlopen Strait (Hinlopenstretet) on Svalbard